= The Icicles =

American indie pop band

The Icicles are an American indie pop band from Grand Rapids, Michigan. The band was founded in 2000 by singer/songwriter/guitarist Gretchen DeVault, keyboardist Joleen Rumsey and drummer Korrie Sue, who met when they were students at Grand Valley State University. The group released a debut EP titled Pure Sugar in 2000.

The Icicles developed a reputation for wearing matching handmade stage outfits—a reputation that was referenced in the title of the group's 2005 debut LP A Hundred Patterns. By that time, Korrie Sue had been replaced on drums by Greg Krupp, and bassist Emily Krueger had joined the band. This lineup was augmented by second guitarist Rebecca Rodriguez for the recording of 2007's Arrivals and Departures, after which Krupp was replaced by Gretchen's husband Zane DeVault and Krueger was replaced by Aaron Ekins.

The group's 2012 release Renegade Parade took a melancholic turn, in part because of DeVault's struggle with postpartum depression. This emotional, melancholy side to DeVault's songwriting led to the founding of the shoegaze/dream pop group Voluptuous Panic with music journalist Brian J. Bowe in 2013.

== Commercials ==
The Icicles' song “La Ti Da” was featured in a commercial for American retail chain Target Corporation as part of its "Long Live Happy" campaign, while its song “Sugar Sweet” was featured in a commercial for Motorola.

== Discography ==
=== Studio albums ===
- A Hundred Patterns (MicroIndie Records, 2005)
- Arrivals and Departures (MicroIndie Records, 2007)
- Renegade Parade (MicroIndie Records, 2012)

=== Extended plays ===
- Pure Sugar EP (MicroIndie Records, 2000)
- Trees Touch Skies (2015)
